Pachliopta oreon is a species of butterfly from the family Papilionidae. It is found only on the Lesser Sunda Islands.

The wingspan is 100–110 mm. The wings are dark-brown. There are red spots and a white markings on the wings.

References

Pachliopta
Butterflies described in 1891